Andrei Jämsä (born 14 February 1982) is an Estonian rower. Due to a back injury he could not compete in 2007. He is a member of rowing club "Pärnu Sõudeklubi" (Pärnu Rowing Club) located in Pärnu.

Junior years
Jämsä was born in Pärnu.  He competed in the U-23 world Regatta in the double sculls event in 2002 with Igor Kuzmin, earning 7th position and in 2003 with Oleg Vinogradov earning 4th position.

Olympic Games
His first appearance in the Olympic Games was in Athens 2004, where he competed in the quadruple sculls event with Andrei Šilin, Kuzmin and Vinogradov earning 9th position overall.

In Beijing 2008 Jämsä competed in the single sculls event earning 17th position overall.

At the 2012 Summer Olympics, he again competed in the men's quadruple sculls with Tõnu Endrekson, Allar Raja and Kaspar Taimsoo.  The team finished 4th.

World championships
Jämsä's debut in the World Rowing Championships took place in Milan, Italy in 2003, where he competed in the double sculls event with Kuzmin earning 9th position overall.

Jämsä won his first World Championships medal in 2005 in Gifu, Japan in the quadruple sculls event with Tõnu Endrekson, Leonid Gulov and Jüri Jaanson when they finished third after Poland and Slovenia.

In the 2006 World Championships held in Eton, Great Britain Jämsä was again the strokesman in the bronze-winning quadruple sculls team with Endrekson, Kuzmin and Allar Raja. Gold medals went to Poland and silver medals to Ukraine.

Rowing World Cup
Overall wins
Quadruple sculls: 2005

References

External links

 
 
 
 

 Andrei Jämsä fanclub 

1982 births
Living people
Estonian male rowers
Rowers at the 2004 Summer Olympics
Rowers at the 2008 Summer Olympics
Rowers at the 2012 Summer Olympics
Rowers at the 2016 Summer Olympics
Olympic rowers of Estonia
Sportspeople from Pärnu
World Rowing Championships medalists for Estonia
Medalists at the 2016 Summer Olympics
Olympic medalists in rowing
Olympic bronze medalists for Estonia
Recipients of the Order of the White Star, 3rd Class
European Rowing Championships medalists